Fredrik Jonsson (born 28 March 1977) is a retired tennis player from Sweden, who turned professional in 1996. The right-hander reached his career-high singles ranking of World No. 108 in July 2000. Jonsson comes from the same hometown as teenage colleague-star Andreas Vinciguerra.

Tennis career

Juniors
As a junior, Jonsson reached as high as No. 19 in the world singles rankings in 1995. His best result was reaching the semifinals at the 1995 Junior Italian Open where he lost to the eventual champion, Mariano Zabaleta.

Pro career 
Jonsson made his ATP main draw singles debut, as a qualifier, at the 1986 Swedish Open where he lost in the first round to Carlos Costa. He subsequently participated mainly on the ITF Futures circuit and the ATP Challenger Tour. In September 1998, he reached his first final on the Challenger tour, when he lost in the final of the Budva Challenger against Tomas Behrend. In October 1998, he won the Samarkand Challenger by beating Oleg Ogorodov in the final.

In Grand Slam tennis, his best performance was at the 1999 US Open, when he reached the third round and beat world number 16, Nicolás Lapentti in the second round, before losing to Slava Doseděl.

ATP Challenger and ITF Futures finals

Singles: 7 (3–4)
{|
|-valign=top
|

References

1977 births
Living people
Swedish male tennis players
Sportspeople from Malmö